Sealed Valley is a 1915 American silent Western film, directed by Lawrence McGill. It stars Dorothy Donnelly, J. W. Johnson, Rene Ditline, and was released on August 2, 1915.  It was the first film produced by Metro Pictures.

Cast list
 Dorothy Donnelly as Nahnya Crossfox
 J. W. Johnson as Doctor Cowdray
 Rene Ditline as Kitty Sholto

References

External links 
 
 
 

1915 films
1915 Western (genre) films
American black-and-white films
Metro Pictures films
Silent American Western (genre) films
1910s American films